Brianna Ste-Marie (born 30 August 1996) is a Canadian submission grappler, and
Brazilian jiu-jitsu (BJJ) black belt athlete. An IBJJF World No-Gi, Pan American (Gi and No-GI), European and American national jiu-jitsu champion in coloured belts, as well as a Combat Jiu-Jitsu and Medusa champion; Ste-Marie is the 2022 World No-GI champion and the 2022 ADCC Submission Grappling under  silver medallist.

Biography 
Brianna Ste-Marie was born on 30 August 1996, in Montreal, Quebec, Canada. A successful rugby player throughout her childhood and teenage years, she started training Brazilian jiu-jitsu (BJJ) after starting university. At 19 she decided to quit rugby for BJJ.

In December 2020 after getting promoted to brown belt, Ste-Marie became Combat Jiu-Jitsu flyweight champions after defeating Liz Tracy in the final. In October 2021 competing at Medusa 1, a Female-Only Jiu-Jitsu event, Ste-Marie became bantamweight Combat Jiu-Jitsu rules Medusa champion. after submitting Nikki Sullivan.

In 2021, Ste-Marie won the IBJJF No-Gi Worlds and the American Nationals, both at brown belt

Black belt career
On 4 December 2021, after winning the ADCC East Coast Trials, defeating no-gi world champions Raquel Canuto and Nathalie Ribeiro and Jasmine Rocha, Ste-Marie was promoted to Brazilian Jiu-Jitsu black belt,  by Brazilian Top Team Canada’s head coach, Fabio Holanda.
At the end of 2021, Ste-Marie was awarded with "Female Breakout Grappler of the Year" by BJJ and grappling media outlet Jits magazine at the 2021 BJJ Awards.

In April 2022 Ste-Marie won the 2nd ADCC North American Trials thus qualifying for the ADCC World Championship. Ste-Marie became the first woman in ADCC history to win both East and West Coast trials in the same cycle, defeating 10 opponents across both Trials competitions. During the 2022 ADCC World Championship Ste-Marie won silver after defeating Finnish Elvira Karppinen in the first round and Bianca Basilia via Points (4-0) in the semi-final before losing to current BJJ World champion Ffion Davies in the final. In 2021 Jitsmagazine awarded Ste-Marie received their 'Female Breakout Grappler of the Year' award.

She was then invited to compete in the women's under 66kg grand prix at Polaris 23 on March 11, 2023. Ste-Marie won her opening round match against Maggie Grindatti but lost in the second round to Amy Campo.

Competitive summary 
Main achievements:
 IBJJF World No-GI Champion (2022)
 2nd Place 2022 ADCC Submission Fighting World Championship
 ADCC East Coast Trials winner (2021)
 ADCC West Coast Trials winner (2022)
 Combat Jiu-Jitsu flyweight Champion (2020)

In coloured belts:
 IBJJF World No-Gi Champion (2019 purple, 2021 brown)
 IBJJF Pan American Champion (2018 blue, 2020 purple)
 IBJJF Pan Championship No-Gi Champion (2018 blue, 2019 purple)
 IBJJF European Open Champion (2020 purple)
 IBJJF American Nationals Champion (2021 brown)
 IBJJF American Nationals No-Gi Champion (2021 brown)
 2nd place IBJJF American Nationals (2021 brown)
 2nd place IBJJF World Championship No-Gi (2018 blue)
 2nd place IBJJF Pan Championship No-Gi (2017 blue)
 3rd place IBJJF World Championship (2018 blue, 2019 purple)
 3rd place IBJJF World Championship No-Gi (2019 purple, 2021  brown)
 3rd place IBJJF Pan Championship (2020  brown)
 3rd place IBJJF European Open (2020  purple)

Instructor lineage 
Carlos Gracie > Helio Gracie > Carlson Gracie
Murilo Bustamante > Fábio Holanda > Brianna Ste-Marie
Sérgio Bolão > Ricardo Marques > Leonardo Saggioro > Brianna Ste-Marie

Notes

References 

Living people
1996 births
Canadian practitioners of Brazilian jiu-jitsu
People awarded a black belt in Brazilian jiu-jitsu
Sportspeople from Montreal
Canadian submission wrestlers